The long haul, A long haul, long haul, or longhaul may refer to:

Films
 The Long Haul (1957 film), a British film starring Diana Dors
 The Long Haul, a 1960 film featuring the town of Sintaluta, Saskatchewan
 The Long Haul (1988 film), a Brazilian film
 A Long Haul, 2010 documentary film directed by Nathaniel Kramer
 Diary of a Wimpy Kid: The Long Haul (film), the fourth Diary of a Wimpy Kid film, released 2017

Literature
 The Long Haul (novel), 1938 by A. I. Bezzerides
 The Long Haul (autobiography), 1999 by Myles Horton
 The Long Haul, 2003 by Amanda Stern
 The Long Haul (comic book), 2005 by Antony Johnston and Eduardo Barreto
 Diary of a Wimpy Kid: The Long Haul, a 2014 children's novel by Jeff Kinney

Other uses
 Longhaul Records, recording label of Sum of Parts and other albums
 Long Haul (Transformers), multiple characters in the Transformers robot superhero franchise.
 Long-haul, flights with a flight length generally longer than 
 LongHaul, a power saving technology developed by VIA Technologies

See also 
 Long-hauler, sufferer of long COVID, long-term effects following COVID-19 disease